Mark Ian Handelsman (born 9 June 1961) is a retired South African-born Israeli middle distance runner who specialized in the 800 metres.

He was born in Johannesburg, South Africa. Handelsman competed for Israel at the 1983 World Championships but did not progress from the heats. At the 1984 Summer Olympic, he competed in both 400 metres, 800 metres and 1500 metres without reaching the final.

His personal best time for the 800m was 1.45.3 minutes, achieved in April 1981 in Stellenbosch.

See also
List of Israeli records in athletics
List of Maccabiah records in athletics

References

External links
 

1961 births
Living people
South African male middle-distance runners
Athletes (track and field) at the 1984 Summer Olympics
Olympic athletes of Israel
South African emigrants to Israel
Sportspeople from Johannesburg
Israeli male middle-distance runners
World Athletics Championships athletes for Israel